Maciej Scherfchen  (born 24 February 1979 in Szamotuły) is a retired Polish professional footballer.

Career

Club
In January 2011, he joined Warta Poznań.

International career
Scherfchen has made two appearances for the Poland national football team.

References

External links
 
 

1979 births
Living people
Polish footballers
Poland international footballers
Association football midfielders
Sokół Pniewy players
Lech Poznań players
Polonia Warsaw players
Widzew Łódź players
Ruch Chorzów players
Arka Gdynia players
Ekstraklasa players
AEP Paphos FC players
Warta Poznań players
Olimpia Elbląg players
Polish expatriate footballers
Expatriate footballers in Cyprus
Cypriot First Division players
People from Szamotuły
Sportspeople from Greater Poland Voivodeship